The 2011 Ukrainian Football Amateur League season.

Teams

Returning
 FC Sambir
 Zbruch Volochysk
 FC Dinaz Vyshhorod
 Slavutych Cherkasy
 Krystal Kherson
 Avanhard Kramatorsk
 Metalurh Malyn

Debut
List of teams that are debuting this season in the league.

FC Korosten, Arsenal Zhytomyr, FC Putrivka, Nove Zhyttya Andriivka, SKAD-Yalpuh Bolhrad, Real Pharma Yuzhne, Makiyivvuhillya Makiivka, FC Lysychansk, FC Popasna

Withdrawn
List of clubs that took part in last year competition, but chose not to participate in 2011 season:

 Elektrometalurh-NZF Nikopol
 FC Ternopil

 Topilche Ternopil
 Verest Dunaivtsi

 Khimmash Korosten

Location map

First stage

Group 1

Group 2

Group 3

Group 4

Play-off
ODEK Orzhiv – Yednist-2 Plysky 0:0 (aet) pen. 3:1

Finals

Group A

Group B

Championship match

See also
 2011 Ukrainian Amateur Cup

References

External links
 Amateur League (2011). RSSSF

Ukrainian Football Amateur League seasons
4
4
Uk
Uk